Niels Bjørn Larsen (15 October 1913 in Copenhagen – 13 March 2003) was a Danish ballet dancer, choreographer and balletmaster. He was admitted to the Royal Danish Ballet school in 1920 and debuted in a production of Gudindernes Strid in 1933. In 1942 was promoted to soloist and remained with the Royal Danish Ballet until 1986.

In the beginning of the 1930s Larsen toured Europe and the US with the Swiss mime Trudi Schoop. This, together with a study trip to France, England and the US, laid the ground for his great career as a mime and character dancer, a career in world class.

Larsen was balletmaster at the Royal Danish Theatre during two periods, 1951–56 and 1961–65. From 1956 to 1980 he was artistic leader of the Pantomime Theatre at Tivoli. As choreographer he made ballets on the Royal Danish Theatre, the Pantomime Theatre and at other theatres, as well as in film. He documented performances from the Royal Danish Ballet from 1950.

Larsen was a Knight of the 1st Class in the Order of the Dannebrog. He married pianist Elvi Henriksen on 13 August 1946, with whom he had a daughter, Dinna Bjørn; he is buried in Bispebjerg Kirkegård.

References

External links 
 
 
 Den Store Danske Encyklopædi: Den Kongelige Ballet  
 Kraks Blå Bog 1974  
 NY Times; Niels Larsen, 89, Dancer With Knack for Mime, Dies; Anna Kisselgoff, 21 March 2003
 NY Times; Making the Most of the Least Glamorous Roles; Eric V. Copage, 23 May 1999
 NY Times; Blonde Marie' Ballet Opens; 28 April 1937
 NY Times; 'Coppelia,' Danish Version; Royal Company Dances to Music by Delibes; John Martin, 26 May 1956 
 NY Times; Royal Danish Troupe Bows; Greeted by a Packed House at the 'Met' 'Sylphide,' 'Graduation Ball' on Program; John Martin, 17 September 1956

1913 births
2003 deaths
Danish male ballet dancers
Ballet choreographers
Royal Danish Ballet dancers
Ballet masters
Danish mimes
Knights First Class of the Order of the Dannebrog